Millstreet GAA is a Gaelic Athletic Association club based in the parish of Millstreet in Cork, Ireland. Primarily a Gaelic football club, it participates in competitions organized by Cork GAA county board and Duhallow division.

Achievements
 Cork Senior Football Championship Winner (1) 1948  Runner-Up 1940, 1941, 1956
 Cork Intermediate Football Championship Winners (1) 1918  Runner-Up 1967
 Cork Junior Football Championship Winner (3) 1941, 1963, 2014  Runner-Up 1902, 1944
 Cork Minor B Hurling Championship Winner 2000  Runner-Up 1994
 Duhallow Junior A Football Championship Winners (7) 1941, 1944, 1955, 1963, 1992, 2003, 2014 Runners-Up 1933, 1939, 1946, 1998, 2012
 Duhallow Junior A Hurling Championship Winners (3) 1933, 1962, 1963  Runners-Up 1934, 1935, 1944, 1955, 1960, 1996, 2004, 2005

Notable players
 Humphrey Kelleher
 John Coleman
 J.J. Hinchion
 Dinny Long
 Con Hartnett
 Mark Ellis

References

Gaelic games clubs in County Cork
Gaelic football clubs in County Cork
Hurling clubs in County Cork
Millstreet